Anstruther Easter in Fife was a royal burgh, created in 1583,  that returned one commissioner to the Parliament of Scotland and to the Convention of Estates.

After the Acts of Union 1707, Anstruther Easter, Anstruther Wester, Crail, Kilrenny and Pittenweem formed the Anstruther Easter district of burghs, returning one member between them to the House of Commons of Great Britain.

List of burgh commissioners

 1661–63: Alexander Black, councillor 
 1665 convention: Andrew Martins, bailie 
1667 convention: not represented
 1673–74: Alexander Gibson 
 1678 convention: James Lauson, bailie 
 1681–82: Robert Anstruther
 1685–86: Robert Innes of Blairtoun, councillor 
 1689 convention, 1689–90: David Spence, former baillie of Edinburgh (expelled 1693) 
 1696–1701: Patrick Murray of Dullary 
 1702–07: Sir John Anstruther

References

See also
 List of constituencies in the Parliament of Scotland at the time of the Union

Constituencies of the Parliament of Scotland (to 1707)
Politics of Fife
History of Fife
Constituencies disestablished in 1707
1707 disestablishments in Scotland